Steve Jackson (born 20 May 1951) is a British game designer, writer, game reviewer and co-founder of UK game publisher Games Workshop.

History
Steve Jackson began his career in games in 1974 as a freelance journalist with Games & Puzzles magazine. In early 1975, Jackson co-founded the company Games Workshop with school friends John Peake and Ian Livingstone. They started publishing a monthly newsletter, Owl and Weasel, which was largely written by Jackson, and sent copies of the first issue to subscribers of Albion fanzine; Brian Blume, co-partner of American publisher TSR, received one of these copies and in return sent back a copy of TSR's new game Dungeons & Dragons. Jackson and Livingstone felt that this game was more imaginative than anything being produced in the UK at the time, and so worked out an arrangement with Blume for an exclusive deal to sell D&D in Europe. In late 1975, Jackson and Livingstone organized their first convention, the first Games Day. While selling game products directly out of their flat, their landlord kicked them out in the summer of 1976 after people kept showing up there looking for an actual store. By 1978 the first Games Workshop store had opened, in London.

At a Games Day convention in 1980 Jackson and Livingstone met Geraldine Cooke, an editor at Penguin Books.  They persuaded her to consider publication of a book about the role-playing hobby.  This was originally intended to be an introductory guide, but the idea of an interactive gamebook seemed more appealing. After several months Cooke decided that this was viable and commissioned Jackson and Livingstone to develop it. In 1980, Jackson and Livingstone began to develop the concept of the Fighting Fantasy gamebook series, the first volume of which (The Warlock of Firetop Mountain) was published in 1982 by Puffin Books (a subsidiary imprint of Penguin). Jackson and Livingstone would go on to individually write many volumes each, with further authors adding even more. Steve Jackson notably wrote Sorcery!, a four-part series utilizing the same system as Fighting Fantasy but where Fighting Fantasy mainly targeted children, Steve Jackson's Sorcery! was marketed to an older audience. Jackson and Livingstone attributed the gamebooks' popularity to their difficulty.

After the success of the Fighting Fantasy series, Jackson designed the first interactive telephone role-playing game, FIST, which was based loosely on the concepts of the gamebooks. Jackson and Livingstone sold off their stake in Games Workshop in 1991. In the mid-1990s Jackson spent 2.5 years as a games journalist with the London Daily Telegraph. He then set up computer games developer Lionhead Studios with Peter Molyneux. Jackson left Lionhead in 2006 when Microsoft bought the company. He is an honorary professor at Brunel University in London, where he teaches the Digital Games Theory and Design MA.

He is often mistaken for the American game designer with the same name: Steve Jackson. The American Jackson wrote three books in the Fighting Fantasy series, which adds to the confusion, especially as these books were simply credited to "Steve Jackson" without any acknowledgement that it was a different person.

Works

Books
 The Warlock of Firetop Mountain (1982) with Ian Livingstone, Puffin Books
 Sorcery! 1–4 (1983–85), Puffin Books
 The Citadel of Chaos (1983), Puffin Books
 Starship Traveller (1984), Puffin Books
 House of Hell (1984), Puffin Books
 Fighting Fantasy: The Introductory Role-playing Game (1984), Puffin Books
 Appointment with F.E.A.R. (1985), Puffin Books
  The Tasks of Tantalon (1985), Oxford University Press
 Creature of Havoc (1986), Puffin Books
 The Trolltooth Wars (1989), Puffin Books

Video games
 Lost Eden (1995), Virgin Interactive
 Close Combat: Invasion – Normandy (2000), Strategic Simulations, Inc.
 Fighting Fantasy: The Warlock of Firetop Mountain (2001), Laughing Jackal
 The Movies (Premiere Edition) (2005), Activision
 Fighting Fantasy: The Warlock of Firetop Mountain (2009), Big Blue Bubble
 Sorcery! 1 – The Shamutanti Hills (2013), Inkle
 Sorcery! 2 – Kharé – Cityport of Traps (2013), Inkle
 Sorcery! 3 – The Seven Serpents (2015), Inkle
 Sorcery! 4 – The Crown Of Kings (2016), Inkle

Other
 BattleCards – a card game first published in 1993 that features a unique scratch-and-slay system
 Fantasy Interactive Scenarios by Telephone (F.I.S.T.) – a telephone-based single-player roleplaying game similar to Fighting Fantasy

References

External links
 
 Steve Jackson interview on Yog Radio about Games Workshop and Fighting Fantasy, June 2010
 
 

1951 births
Academics of Brunel University London
Alumni of Keele University
Board game designers
British gamebook writers
British retail company founders
British video game designers
Fighting Fantasy
Games Workshop
Living people
Mass media people from Manchester
Role-playing game designers
Lionhead Studios